Aditi Shankar (born 19 June 1993) is an Indian actress and singer who works in the Indian cinema prominently in Tamil films. Aditi debuted as an actress in director M. Muthaiah's blockbuster Tamil film Viruman (2022) with actor Karthi.

Early life
Aditi was born on 19 June 1993 at Chennai, Tamil Nadu in India. She is the daughter of Indian filmmaker S. Shankar. She also has an elder sister, Aishwarya Shankar and a younger brother, Arjith Shankar. Aditi completed her medical degree at Sri Ramachandra University. After graduation she confessed to her parents about her long term passion for acting, following which she make her debut in Viruman.

Career
Aditi debuted as a playback singer for the song "Romeo and Juliet" from the Telugu film Ghani  starring Varun Tej which received positive feedback from critics. The music video and song was ranked at number 1 position for a whole one month in India alone. She also sang the song Madura Veeran in her debut film in 2022 as well.
 
In 2021, She was approached by film director M. Muthaiah offering Aditi the lead role in the masala film Viruman playing the lead female character in the film. It was released on 12 August 2022. The Outlook India wrote "Karthi-Aditi Shankar Win You Over with an Engrossing Family Entertainer". The Hindu wrote, "Aditi Shankar is definitely an upgrade from Muthaiya’s previous films". The Times of India wrote, "Take the initial scenes with the female lead, Thaenu (Aditi Shankar, making a confident debut). She is shown as someone who is affectionate towards Muthupandi, even though he is a man who is hard to like. We think this equation between them would pose a challenge to Viruman, who has fallen for her and wants to marry her, but in just a couple of scenes, we see the character shifting her allegiance, thanks to a convenient plot development".
She also started filming for her a new film, which is directed by Director Madonne Ashwin officially roped her in, along with Sivakarthikeyan, for his next film, Maaveeran.

Personal life
Just before her debut film Viruman was released in 2022. Actress and model Aathmika targeted Aditi on social media and stirred up controversy considering Aditi to be the main reason for Nepotism in south Indian films stating "It’s good to see privileged getting easy way through the ladder while the rest". Aathmika also stated saying "Aditi is privileged to be able to enter the film industry just because of her father". However Aditi later back lashed at Aathmika for her words and later removing her social media status.

Filmography 

Note: All films are in Tamil, unless otherwise noted.

Discography

Playback singer

Music videos

References

External links 

 

Living people
Actresses in Tamil cinema
Indian film actresses
Actresses from Chennai
1997 births
21st-century Indian actresses
Telugu playback singers
Indian women playback singers